The Park Place–Arroyo Terrace Historic District is a residential historic district located in northwest Pasadena, California. The district includes eleven contributing houses built from 1902 to 1912. Most of the houses in the district were influenced by the Arts and Crafts Movement, which was popular in Pasadena in the early 20th century; particular styles in the district include the American Craftsman house, the Craftsman bungalow, the Colonial Revival house, and the Prairie School house. Prominent Pasadena architects Charles and Henry Greene designed seven of the district's houses; the district is the most concentrated collection of their works in Pasadena. Two other noted Craftsman architects, Myron Hunt and Sylvanus Marston, also designed homes in the district, including Hunt's own residence.

The district was added to the National Register of Historic Places on June 29, 2007.

References

Houses on the National Register of Historic Places in California
American Craftsman architecture in California
National Register of Historic Places in Pasadena, California
Buildings and structures on the National Register of Historic Places in Pasadena, California
Houses in Pasadena, California
Historic districts on the National Register of Historic Places in California
Greene and Greene buildings
Myron Hunt buildings